Broadbeach North light rail station located in the suburb of Broadbeach is serviced by the Gold Coast light rail system known as the G:link. The station serves the northern end of the Broadbeach precinct, offering direct access to the Gold Coast Convention and Exhibition Centre, Oasis Shopping Centre and the Star Casino.

Broadbeach North is located in the median of the Gold Coast Highway.

Location 
Below is a map of the area that surrounds the station.

References

External links 

 G:link

G:link stations
Railway stations in Australia opened in 2014
Broadbeach, Queensland